Loizidou v. Turkey is a landmark legal case regarding the rights of refugees wishing to return to their former homes and properties. The European Court of Human Rights ruled that Titina Loizidou, and consequently all other refugees, have the right to return to their former properties. The ECHR ruled that Turkey had violated Loizidou's human rights under Article I of Protocol I of the European Convention on Human Rights, that she should be allowed to return to her home and that Turkey should pay damages to her. Turkey initially ignored this ruling. 

On 22 July 1989 a Cypriot national Loizidou filed an application against Turkey to the European Court of Human Rights, represented by Greek-Cypriot lawyer Achilleas Demetriades. Loizidou had been forced out of her home during Turkey's invasion of Cyprus in 1974 along with around 200,000 other Greek-Cypriots. During more than 20 years, she made a number of attempts to return to her home in Kyrenia but was denied entry into the Turkish occupied part of Cyprus by the Turkish army.

Her application resulted in three judgments by the European Court of Human Rights (Strasbourg) which held Turkey responsible for human rights violations in the northern part of Cyprus, which is under overall control of the Turkish armed forces.

The U.S. Department of State commented on this case as follows:

The Court also stated expressly that the damages awarded were not compensation for the property per se, but only for the denial of the ownership and use of the property, and that Loizidou retains full legal ownership of her property.

In 2003 Turkey paid Loizidou the compensation amounts (of over $1 million) ruled by the European Court of Human Rights.

Precedent 

The case serves as important precedent for judgments in international courts of law regarding the Cyprus dispute. Similar cases have been brought to the ECHR are awaiting judgement and two have been concluded in a similar fashion:
 May 2007: Myra Xenides v. Turkey, where Myra Xenides was awarded damages for loss of use of her property in Famagusta.
 April 2008: Demades v. Turkey, where Ioannis Demades was awarded damages amounting to €835,000 for loss of use of his Kyrenia property.

The Loizidou case was also cited in the 2001 judgment on the interstate case Cyprus v. Turkey.

See also 
 Apostolides v Orams
 Eleni Foka
 Greek Cypriots, et al. v. TRNC and HSBC Bank USA
 Human rights in Turkey
 Human rights in Northern Cyprus

References

External links 
 Judgment on preliminary objections (1995)
 Judgment on merits (1996)
 Judgment on just satisfaction (1998)

1996 in case law
Cyprus dispute
European Court of Human Rights cases decided by the Grand Chamber
European Court of Human Rights cases involving Turkey
European Court of Human Rights cases involving Cyprus
Article 1 of Protocol No. 1 of the European Convention on Human Rights